The 1902 Lehigh Brown and White football team was an American football team that represented Lehigh University as an independent during the 1902 college football season. In its first season under head coach Samuel B. Newton, the team compiled a 7–3–1 record and outscored opponents by a total of 246 to 57.

Schedule

References

Lehigh
Lehigh Mountain Hawks football seasons
Lehigh Brown and White football